Tlachene Cove (‘Zaliv Tlachene’ \'za-liv 'tla-che-ne\) is the 4 km wide cove indenting for 3.6 km Loubet Coast on the Antarctic Peninsula.  It is part of Darbel Bay, entered southwest of Kudelin Point and northeast of Gostilya Point.  The cove was formed as a result of the retreat of Hopkins Glacier during the last two decades of the 20th century.

The feature is named after the settlement of Tlachene in Northwestern Bulgaria.

Location
British mapping in 1976.

Maps
 British Antarctic Territory.  Scale 1:200000 topographic map. DOS 610 Series, Sheet W 66 64.  Directorate of Overseas Surveys, Tolworth, UK, 1976.
 Antarctic Digital Database (ADD). Scale 1:250000 topographic map of Antarctica. Scientific Committee on Antarctic Research (SCAR). Since 1993, regularly upgraded and updated.

References
 Tlachene Cove. SCAR Composite Antarctic Gazetteer.
 Bulgarian Antarctic Gazetteer. Antarctic Place-names Commission. (details in Bulgarian, basic data in English)

External links
 Tlachene Cove. Copernix satellite image

Bulgaria and the Antarctic
Coves of Graham Land
Loubet Coast